The Bamberger rearrangement is the chemical reaction of phenylhydroxylamines with strong aqueous acid, which will rearrange to give 4-aminophenols. It is named for the German chemist Eugen Bamberger (1857–1932).

The starting phenylhydroxylamines are typically synthesized by the transfer hydrogenation of nitrobenzenes using rhodium or zinc catalysts.

Application: Fenhexamide

Reaction mechanism
The mechanism of the Bamberger rearrangement proceeds from the monoprotonation of N-phenylhydroxylamine 1.  N-protonation 2 is favored, but unproductive.  O-protonation 3 can form the nitrenium ion 4, which can react with nucleophiles (H2O) to form the desired 4-aminophenol 5.

See also
Friedel–Crafts alkylation-like reactions:
Hofmann-Martius rearrangement
Fries rearrangement
Fischer–Hepp rearrangement
Wallach rearrangement
Bamberger triazine synthesis - same inventor

References

Rearrangement reactions
Name reactions